Adolfo Quintieri (22 May 1887 – 13 July 1970) was an Italian politician who served as Mayor of Cosenza (1946–1948), member of the Constituent Assembly (1946–1948) and Deputy (1948–1953).

References

1887 births
1970 deaths
Mayors of Cosenza
Deputies of Legislature I of Italy
Members of the Constituent Assembly of Italy
People from Cosenza
Christian Democracy (Italy) politicians